Transitions is the third album of Boston-based Ska band Westbound Train.  It is their first release for Hellcat Records.

Track listing 
 "Transition 1" (0:54)
 "Please Forgive Me" (3:53)
 "Good Enough" (4:27)
 "For The First Time" (3:25)
 "The Test" (4:33)
 "Sorry Mama" (4:42)
 "I'm No Different" (4:16)
 "Gone" (3:46)
 "The Runaround" (4:08)
 "Seven Ways To Sunday" (4:37)
 "Soul Revival" (3:57)
 "Transition 2" (0:40)
 "I Feel Fine" (4:39)
 "Fatty Boom Boom" (3:44)
 "When I Die" (4:12)
 "Travel On" (6:02)

References

External links 
 Band Website

2006 albums
Westbound Train albums